Elisha Wolsey Peck (1799-1888) was the chief justice of the Alabama Supreme Court from 1869–1873 and the president of the 1867 Alabama State Constitutional Convention.

Background
Peck was born on August 7, 1799, in Blenheim, New York. He began to study law in 1819. In 1824 he was admitted to practice in Superior Court at Albany, New York. The following year he was admitted to the bar in Syracuse, New York. He then moved to Elyton, Alabama where he practiced law, but a few years later moved to Tuscaloosa, Alabama. Peck served from 1839-1841 as chancellor of the Middle Division Chancery Court. Peck was an opponent of secession but did not actively aid the cause of the Union during the Civil War. He was a candidate for representative to the Alabama Constitutional Convention of 1865 but was defeated. In 1867, he moved to Sycamore, Illinois then to Rockford, Illinois and then back to Tuscaloosa, Alabama. He was elected chairman of the Military Reconstruction Convention of 1867. Later that year, Peck, a member of the Republican Party, was chosen as chief justice of the Alabama Supreme Court, where he served until retiring in 1874. He died at his home in Tuscaloosa, Alabama on February 13, 1888. One of his children was poet Samuel Minturn Peck.

References

Sources
Delegates to the Constitutional Convention held at Montgomery, November 5-December 6, 1867
Elisha Wolsey Peck papers, W.S. Hoole Special Collections Library, The University of Alabama.

1799 births
1888 deaths
Politicians from Tuscaloosa, Alabama
People from Schoharie County, New York
Chief Justices of the Supreme Court of Alabama
New York (state) lawyers
19th-century American judges
19th-century American lawyers